Betsy Hannig (born November 10, 1963) is a former Democratic member of the Illinois House of Representatives, having been appointed to serve as a placeholder caused by the vacancy caused by the resignation of her husband, Gary Hannig, who was appointed by Governor Pat Quinn to be Illinois Secretary of Transportation.

References

External links
Illinois General Assembly - Representative Gary Hannig (D) 98th District official IL House website
Bills Committees

1963 births
Living people
Women state legislators in Illinois
Democratic Party members of the Illinois House of Representatives
People from Litchfield, Illinois
University of Illinois Urbana-Champaign alumni
21st-century American women